Pasiphila semochlora is a moth in the family Geometridae. It is found in New Zealand.

References

Moths described in 1919
semochlora
Moths of New Zealand
Endemic fauna of New Zealand
Taxa named by Edward Meyrick
Endemic moths of New Zealand